Pretty Woman is a 1990 romantic comedy film.

Pretty Woman may also refer to:
 "Oh, Pretty Woman", or simply "Pretty Woman", a song co-written and recorded by Roy Orbison, later covered by Van Halen
 "Pretty Woman", a song by Robbie Williams from the 2016 album The Heavy Entertainment Show
 Pretty Woman: The Musical, a 2018 musical

See also
 Pretty Women, a song in the 1979 musical Sweeney Todd: The Demon Barber of Fleet Street
 "Oh, Pretty Woman", a song by A. C. Williams recorded on Albert King's 1967 album Born Under a Bad Sign, later recorded by several others including Gary Moore
Pretty Girl (disambiguation)
Pretty Lady (disambiguation)